The Rajah Sikatuna Protected Landscape is a protected landscape area of forested limestone hills, grasslands and natural springs in the island province of Bohol in the Central Visayas region of the Philippines. It is the largest remaining tract of natural forest in Bohol and one of the Philippines' top birdwatching sites. The park is one of the island's major tourist attractions located just south of the famous Chocolate Hills. It was named after the Bohol chieftain who entered into a blood-compact with Spanish conquistador Miguel López de Legazpi on the island in 1565.

Description

The Rajah Sikatuna park occupies the low mountain range in the south of Bohol island which corresponds geographically with the municipalities of Carmen, Sierra Bullones, Garcia Hernandez, Valencia, Dimiao, Bilar , Loboc and Batuan. It is characterized by rolling hills with remnants of natural forest on steep limestone terrain surrounded by plantation forest, denuded hills and grasslands.

The park has more than 30 kilometers of marked trails for wildlife observation, over 100 caves, a camping area and a swimming pool. At the summit of Bilar Peak, an observation tower has been constructed providing panoramic views of the park and surrounding countryside, including the nearby island of Panglao and even Cebu. Near the park's entrance is a tunnel that leads to Magsaysay Park, a cleared area situated next to a ranger station and the Logarita spring. The park charges an entrance fee of P100.

Wildlife
The Rajah Sikatuna Protected Landscape is an important bird area being home to over 120 bird species, many of which are endemic to the Philippines, which include the endangered streaked reed warbler and Philippine cockatoo, as well as the Philippine hawk-eagle, Visayan broadbill, Samar hornbill, Mindanao bleeding-heart, Philippine eagle-owl, Philippine oriole, Philippine frogmouth, azure-breasted pitta, rufous-tailed jungle flycatcher, rufous-lored kingfisher, southern silvery kingfisher, yellow-breasted tailorbird, yellow-bellied whistler,  black-crowned babbler, Philippine hanging parrot, Philippine fairy-bluebird, Philippine trogon and Philippine leaf warbler.

The park also supports six species of large mammals namely, the Philippine tarsier, long-tailed macaque, Philippine flying lemur, Malayan civet, Asian palm civet and Philippine warty pig. It is also a habitat of some rodent species, such as the Philippine forest rat, rice-field rat and Mindanao hairy-tailed rat. The more than 100 caves also hold several species of bats and swiftlets. Its forest cover is dominated by native dipterocarp trees such as molave.

Accessibility
It is easily accessible via an 8-kilometer road from the Loay Interior Road in Bilar which also leads to the Chocolate Hills, from either the Tagbilaran–Corella–Sikatuna–Loboc Road or the Tagbilaran East Road from Panglao.

See also
 Central Cebu Protected Landscape
 Olango Island Group
 Loboc River

References

Protected landscapes of the Philippines
Birdwatching sites in the Philippines
Forests of the Philippines
Springs of the Philippines
Geography of Bohol
Landforms of Bohol
Tourist attractions in Bohol
Protected areas established in 1987
1987 establishments in the Philippines